Pierre Sagna can refer to:

 Pierre Sagna (bishop) (1932-2008), a Senegalese Roman Catholic bishop
 Pierre Sagna (footballer) (born 1990), a Senegalese footballer
 Pierre Martin Sagna (born 1950), a Senegalese basketball player